Seán Foran (1931 – 9 July 2015) was an Irish Gaelic footballer who played as a midfielder for the Offaly senior team.

Born in Edenderry, County Offaly, Foran first played competitive Gaelic football during his schooling at St. Mary's Knockbeg College. He arrived on the inter-county scene at the age of seventeen when he first linked up with the Offaly minor team. He made his senior debut during the 1949 championship. Foran immediately became a regular member of the starting fifteen and won one Leinster medal.

As a member of the Leinster inter-provincial team on a number of occasions, Foran won one Railway Cup medal. At club level he was a three-time championship medallist with Edenderry.

Throughout his career Foran made 24 championship appearances. He retired from inter-county football during the 1963-64 league.

In retirement from playing Foran became involved in team management and coaching. He was a selector when Offaly won the All-Ireland title in 1982.

References

1931 births
2015 deaths
Edenderry Gaelic footballers
Offaly inter-county Gaelic footballers
Leinster inter-provincial Gaelic footballers